Dignathodontidae is a monophyletic clade of soil centipedes in the family Geophilidae found in the Mediterranean region, extending to Macaronesia, Caucasus, and western and central Europe. The clade is characterized by a gradually anteriorly tapered body; a short head with non-attenuated antennae; and a poorly sclerotized labrum with tubercles. The number of legs in this clade varies within species and ranges from 43 to 153 pairs of legs.

Genera:

 Agnathodon Folkmanová & Dobroruka, 1960
 Dignathodon Meinert, 1870
 Henia Koch, 1847
 Pagotaenia Chamberlin, 1915
 Zygophilus Chamberlin, 1952

References

Geophilidae
Centipede families